CIMC-TV, branded as Telile, is a community channel based in Arichat, Nova Scotia, broadcasting on channel 10 over the air, and cable channels 4 (on EastLink Cable), and 63 (Seaside Cable). On January 12, 2013, the station was also added by Bell TV, airing on channel 536.

The station's programming is in English and French.

External links
 
CIMC-TV history - Canadian Communication Foundation

Canadian community channels
IMC
Television channels and stations established in 1994
1994 establishments in Nova Scotia